X-Men: Deadly Genesis is a comic book limited series published by Marvel Comics in late 2005 and early 2006. The series was written by Ed Brubaker with interior art done by Trevor Hairsine and covers by Marc Silvestri. Starring the X-Men, this series celebrates the 30th anniversary of Giant-Size X-Men #1 (containing the story titled Second Genesis). The plot deals with the X-Men looking for Professor Charles Xavier, who went missing after House of M, as well as the appearance of a new, incredibly powerful mutant threat.

Plot summary
Deadly Genesis is a retcon of the classic Giant Size X-Men #1 story, titled Second Genesis, from 1975. In that story,  Len Wein used the abduction of the original X-Men by the living island Krakoa as an instrument to discard the first-generation X-Men of 1963. Wein's story depicts Professor X recruiting international characters into a new team of X-Men, to rescue the missing original team; the new team replaced the old when most of the original X-Men left Xavier's school at the end of the story.

In Deadly Genesis, Ed Brubaker writes that this episode was only half of the truth: the international X-Men had been Professor X's second attempt to rescue the original X-Men. The first attempt to retrieve the missing X-Men was conducted with a team of young mutants (the energy-wielding Vulcan, time-manipulator Sway, the reactive evolutionist Darwin, and terra kinetic Petra) who had been taken in by Moira McTaggert, which had ended in catastrophe, seemingly claiming all of their lives. However, Vulcan had survived, having absorbed the energies of his fallen comrades. When Polaris (though mentioned incorrectly in this mini-series as Jean Grey/Phoenix) blasted Krakoa into outer space in Giant Size X-Men #1, Vulcan was shot into space, too, but survived in a comatose state, thanks to Darwin's reactive powers. After the debacle, Cyclops—the only member of the group who was aware of the "first" wave—was deeply distraught, prompting Professor Xavier to decide to mind-wipe him in order to spare him the agony and grief of knowing that his brother died for him, and later working to clear his name by creating an elaborate illusion that Krakoa was sentient.

After the 2005 "House of M" storyline, a large surge of mutant energies was released throughout the galaxy. It awakened the comatose Vulcan and caused him to return to Earth, out for revenge. He kills the X-Man Banshee, easily defeats the X-Men several times in battle with his now semi-godlike powers, and reveals the terrible truth to the X-Men, in full view of Charles Xavier, who explains his own role in events. However, Rachel Summers is able to weaken Vulcan when she realizes that Darwin also survived the attack, converting himself into energy and absorbing the powers of his teammates before combining with Vulcan, Rachel's actions separate Vulcan and Darwin and weaken both. However, when the X-Men attack him to avenge Banshee, Vulcan flees into outer space. Feeling deeply betrayed, Cyclops banishes Professor Xavier from the X-Mansion as punishment.

The storyline from Deadly Genesis continues in Uncanny X-Men #475 in a 12-part story called "The Rise and Fall of the Shi'ar Empire".

Back-up stories
In addition to the main plotline about the X-Men and the Mystery Mutant, each issue of the series features a backup story introducing a new mutant character. In each of these, after the character learns of their powers, they use them to overcome a challenge in their life, which brings them to the attention of a woman who specializes in helping mutant youths. That woman is Moira MacTaggert.

In issue 1, a young girl named Petra runs away to Central Park, using her power of terrakinesis to survive.
In issue 2, a young boy named Armando Muñoz, becomes a scientific wonder when he is dubbed Darwin, the Evolving Boy.
In issue 3, Suzanne Chan survives the crossfire of a gang war in Hong Kong and solves her parents' murder by using her power to freeze and review time, taking on the name Sway.
In issue 4, Gabriel Summers, a young orphan in the care of Moira MacTaggert, learns of his mutant power to control and manipulate energy, while dealing with flashes of memory of his life treated as an outcast in the Shi'ar Empire (while under the rule of D'Ken). He then gains the codename Kid Vulcan. 
In issue 5, a young Emma Frost, following the events of the Emma Frost series, has just begun working as a stripper at the New York Branch of the Hellfire Club. From here, she will go on to work her way up to the rank of White Queen. Xavier and Moira MacTaggert approach her about joining the X-Men, but she refuses. She briefly encounters Kid Vulcan outside the club before Xavier erases her memory of the encounter, which explains why in the current storyline of the same issue, Emma has a vague recognition of Vulcan.

In the current storyline, it is revealed in that Petra, Sway, Darwin, and Kid Vulcan were placed under the tutelage of Moira MacTaggert, much like the original X-Men trained under Xavier. When the original X-Men were lost during their fight against Krakoa the Living Island, Xavier appeared and psychically accelerated the training of Moira's students in order to send them to rescue his own. In the present, Vulcan claims that Xavier left his team to die on Krakoa (presumably, had Emma Frost accepted the invitation to join, she would have become the fifth member of this team and died on Krakoa as well).

Other versions

What if...?
A one-shot comic published in December 2006, presents an alternate reality where Vulcan, the leader of the X-Men, has become one of the most respected heroes in the world while his brother lives in seclusion after Jean's death at Krakoa. The official story was that Vulcan found all the X-Men dead and fled from the living island before it exploded. Krakoa is still drifting in space where it was found by the Silver Surfer. Contained within it were the perfect preserved bodies of all the X-Men, and it is revealed that the original X-Men had not been killed by Krakoa; when attempting to rescue Jean Grey, Vulcan had accidentally incinerated her with his powers, subsequently killing Havok by accident while trying to talk to him, and, in the subsequent panic, went on to kill Angel, Polaris and Iceman, lying to everyone to protect himself. In addition, it is implied he had gotten rid of an unknown number of witnesses to his mistakes as an X-Man. With the truth revealed, Darwin shuts down the part of Vulcan's brain that lets him use his powers, and Vulcan is exiled to Krakoa, contained in an energy dome. However, to protect the public image of mutants, the official story is that Vulcan has left Earth to be a hero to other worlds. At the end, Vulcan is forced to relive that moment when he did what he did, trapped in a time loop by Sway that is programmed to play for him every time he collects food, but says at the end that every time he sees it, he is feeling less and less guilty, privately wondering how long it will take for him to feel nothing.

Collected editions
The series has been collected into a single volume, and a single hardcover.

Deadly Genesis (200 pages, hardcover, August 2006, softcover, January 2007)

The series has also been collected into a 40th anniversary hardcover of Giant-Size X-Men:40 Anniversary Edition. The hardcover collects Giant-Size X-Men #1, 3-4; Classic X-Men #1; X-Men Origins: Colossus one-shot; X-Men Origins: Wolverine one-shot; X-Men: Deadly Genesis #1-6; What If? (1989) #9, #23; and material from X-Men Gold #1

Giant Size X-Men: 40th Anniversary Edition (440 pages, hardcover, June 2015)

References

External links

'X-Men: Deadly Genesis'' at the Unofficial Handbook of Marvel Comics Creators
Deadly Genesis at the Marvel Universe
 Covers by Marc Silvestri

2006 comics debuts
2006 comics endings
Comics by Ed Brubaker